Alberto Carmona (born 3 November 1961) is a Venezuelan equestrian. He competed in the individual jumping event at the 1988 Summer Olympics.

References

External links
 
 
 

1961 births
Living people
Venezuelan male equestrians
Olympic equestrians of Venezuela
Equestrians at the 1988 Summer Olympics
Place of birth missing (living people)
20th-century Venezuelan people